Jimmy Maxwell (1889 – 1 July 1916) was an Irish footballer who played as a forward.

Club career
Maxwell was part of the Linfield side who won a treble in 1901–02, claiming Irish League, Irish Cup and City Cup winners medals, before moving to Glentoran in 1904, scoring on his return to his old club in a 2–2 draw. After a single season with Glentoran, he moved on to Belfast Celtic, where he played in the 1906 Irish Cup Final 2–0 defeat to Shelbourne.

International career
Maxwell made his Ireland debut against Wales during the 1901-02 British Home Championship, and went on to make 7 international appearances, scoring one goal against Wales in 1906.

Death
Maxwell died age 27 on 1 July 1916 whilst serving with the Royal Irish Rifles regiment of the British Army during the Battle of the Somme. He has no known grave and is commemorated on the Thiepval Memorial.

References

Irish association footballers (before 1923)
NIFL Premiership players
Association football forwards
Northern Ireland amateur international footballers
Pre-1950 IFA international footballers
1889 births
1916 deaths
Glentoran F.C. players
British Army personnel of World War I
Royal Ulster Rifles soldiers
British military personnel killed in the Battle of the Somme